Ezra Nahmad (born 1945) is a Monegasque billionaire art dealer and collector. He lives in Monte Carlo, Monaco. As of August 2021, his net worth is estimated at US$1.5 billion.

Background
Ezra was born in Beirut, Lebanon to a Sephardic Jewish family. The roots of the Nahmad family are in Aleppo, where his father, banker Hillel Nahmad lived until just after World War II. Following the Syrian anti-Jewish violence in 1949, his father moved to Beirut, where Ezra and his brothers sold English novels to US sailors stationed there. In the early 1960s, With the rise of Israeli threat against the Lebanese Republic, Ezra's father took him and his brothers, Joseph (Giuseppe) and David, to Milan, Italy. As teenagers, the three began to deal in art, and skipped school to trade on the Italian stock market.

Career
Ezra's first career milestone is believed to have taken place at a Juan Gris exhibition in Rome, organized by cubist dealer Daniel-Henry Kahnweiler. Ezra and his brother bought two works – the only pieces sold. Kahnweiler befriended them, selling them works by Picasso, Braque, and Gris. With the emergence of the Red Brigades terror group in the 1970s, Milan was perceived as too dangerous, and the family moved again. Ezra and his brother Joseph headed for Monaco, and David to New York City.

As of 2013, Ezra and his brother David are considered influential "mega-dealers" of modern and impressionist art by the most well-known names, from Monet and Matisse to Renoir and Rothko. They own an inventory of between 4,000 and 4,500 works, stored in the duty-free Geneva Freeport warehouse next to the airport in Geneva, Switzerland. The brothers buy and sell most of their works at auction. In 2007, Forbes estimated that Ezra, together with his brother David have built an art collection worth $7 to 8 billion.

Personal life
Nahmad is married to Marie Nahmad, resides in Monaco, and has four children. His son Helly Nahmad is a London-based art dealer. In 2007, his daughter Michaela Nahmad was "thought to be embarking on a career as an art dealer" and is married to investor Nathaniel Meyohas. His cousin is Brazilian banker Edmond Safra.

References

External links

Collection David et Ezra Nahmad. Impressionnisme et Audaces du XIXe Siècle

1945 births
Living people
Jewish art collectors
Lebanese art dealers
Lebanese expatriates in Italy
Lebanese expatriates in Monaco
Lebanese Jews
Lebanese people of Syrian-Jewish descent
Monegasque Jews
Ezra
Businesspeople from Beirut
Monegasque people of Lebanese-Jewish descent
Monegasque people of Syrian-Jewish descent
Monegasque billionaires
Lebanese emigrants to Monaco
Safra family